The 45ft 6in Watson-class was a non self-righting displacement hull lifeboat built between 1926 and 1933 and operated by the Royal National Lifeboat Institution between 1926 and 1972.

History
The 45ft 6in Watson-class lifeboat marked the transition from single engine, single screw to twin engine, twin screw layout. The first two boats were similar to the last of the 45ft Watson-class boats, albeit six inches longer due to a forward raked bow. The third boat was the first with twin engines and twin screws while the fourth had twin engines geared to a single screw, a unique layout in RNLI lifeboat history. The twin screw layout proved to be superior and from the fifth boat onwards this was the layout adopted. The 45ft 6in Watsons were long lived and most survived at their original stations into the 1950s when most were replaced by 46ft 9in and, later in the decade, 47ft Watsons. Many boats spent their final years in the reserve fleet with five of the later boats serving until 1969 and one, ON759, continuing in the reserve fleet until 1972. During their service, 45ft 6in Watsons launched on service 2,587 times and are credited with saving 2,613 lives. The single biggest contributor being the Humber lifeboat City of Bradford II ON 709, which in twenty five years at the station launched on service 228 times, saving 305 lives.

Description
The 45ft 6in Watsons differed from the previous 45ft type in having flush decks with no end boxes. The aft cockpit had a shelter ahead of it covering the engine room access hatch. Ahead of this was the exhaust funnel and towards the bow was a further small shelter. The first two boats retained the single engine layout of their predecessors, being powered by the same 80bhp Weyburn DE6 6-cylinder petrol engines. The third boat (ON 700) was the first twin engined version, with two 40bhp Weyburn CE4 4-cylinder petrol engines driving twin screws. The fourth in the series (ON 701) had a unique twin engine, single screw layout which was not repeated. From ON 707 onwards the twin screw layout was standardised. The drop keel fitted to the single engine boats was deleted from the twins and eventually the auxiliary sailing rig was dispensed with on the twins in the light of operational experience.

Fleet
ON is the RNLI's sequential Official Number.

External links
RNLI